The 1949 AAFC season was the final season before the league folded and comprised only twelve games instead of the previously standard fourteen. The 49ers, in their fourth season, were unable to improve on the previous season's output of 12–2, only posting a record of 9–3, however, they were able to make their first playoff appearance. This was due to the league taking a different format, in which the top four teams played a tournament to determine the champion.

The 49ers, with the second seed, played the third-seeded New York Yankees (8–4). With their 17–7 victory over the Yankees, the 49ers moved on to play the Cleveland Browns in the league championship. The 49ers ended up losing 21–7. Until Super Bowl XLVII, it was the only time the 49ers lost a league title game.

Schedule

Playoffs

Standings

References

San Francisco
San Francisco 49ers seasons
1949 in sports in California